Burgtheater Dinslaken  is a theatre in Dinslaken, North Rhine-Westphalia, Germany.

Theatres in North Rhine-Westphalia